is a Japanese actress, singer, and model. She is best known in the West for her roles as Takako Chigusa in Kinji Fukasaku's 2000 film Battle Royale and Gogo Yubari in Quentin Tarantino's 2003 film Kill Bill: Volume 1.

Life and career
She was born in Tsuchiura, Ibaraki. Kuriyama was a popular model during Japan's child model boom in the mid-1990s. In 1997, she appeared in the photobooks Shinwa-Shōjo (Girl of Myth) and Shōjokan (Girl's Residence), photographed by Kishin Shinoyama. Shinwa-Shōjo became a best-seller but, as it contained some nudity, was discontinued by the publisher in 1999 after the institution of new anti–child pornography laws. She also posed as a model for the child fashion magazines Nicola (1997–2001) and Pichi Lemon (1996–2001).

She first achieved widespread recognition as an actress in Japan for her starring roles in the horror films Shikoku (1999) and Ju-on (2000). Chiaki also appeared in the 2000 action film Battle Royale as Takako Chigusa.

Following feature appearances on several notable Japanese television programs (including Rokubanme no Sayoko), Kuriyama made her Hollywood debut in director Quentin Tarantino's 2003 film Kill Bill: Volume 1 as Gogo Yubari, the schoolgirl bodyguard of yakuza boss O-Ren Ishii (Lucy Liu). Kuriyama's other film appearances include major roles in the ninja drama Azumi 2: Death or Love and Takashi Miike's Yōkai Daisensō.

In 2010, she released the CD single "Ryūsei no Namida" on DefStar Records under the artist name "CHiAKi KURiYAMA". The song was used as the first ending theme for Mobile Suit Gundam Unicorn. This single was followed by three others under her name as traditionally written in Japanese: "Kanōsei Girl", "Cold Finger Girl", and "Oishii Kisetsu" / "Ketteiteki Sanpunkan"; "Kanōsei Girl" was used as the third opening theme for Yorinuki Gin Tama-san and "Cold Finger Girl" was used as the opening for the anime adaptation of Level E. She followed the singles with an album, Circus, in 2011.

Discography

Album

Singles

Filmography

Television

Films

Voice roles

Video games

Stage
Dogen's adventure (2008)
Coast of Utopia (2009)
Midnight in Bali (2017)

Photobooks
Namaiki! Photo: Kishin Shinoyama.Text:Akio Nakamori. (1996)
Tenshi/angel (天使)  Photo: Mitsuo Kawamoto. (1996).
Sinwa-Shoujo (神話少女）Photo: Kishin Shinoyama. Text:Akio Nakamori.(1997)
Shoujokan (少女館)Photo: Kishin Shinoyama. (1997)
Shikoku nite (死国にて)(1999)
Kuriyama Chiaki ACCESS BOOK (栗山千明ACCESS BOOK)(1999)
Princess (プリンセス 栗山千明×蜷川実花）Photo: Mika Ninagawa. (2004)
digi+KISHIN DVD:Chiaki Kuriyama. Image Film by Kishin Shinoyama. (ASIN B0001LNO7O,2004)
digi+Girls kishin NO.4 Kuriyama Chiaki (digi+Girls kishin NO.4 栗山 千明) Photo: Kishin Shinoyama. (ASIN: 4255002797, 2004)
Car girl Photo: Kishin Shinoyama. (2004)
Emergence Uka (羽化) Photo: Chikashi Kasai. (2014)

Awards and nominations

Notes

References

External links

 

1984 births
Living people
Voice actresses from Ibaraki Prefecture
People from Tsuchiura
20th-century Japanese actresses
21st-century Japanese actresses
21st-century Japanese women singers
21st-century Japanese singers
Japanese film actresses
Japanese stage actresses
Japanese television actresses
Japanese voice actresses
Japanese female models
Child models
Japanese women pop singers
Defstar Records artists
Musicians from Ibaraki Prefecture
Japanese video game actresses